Jordy Leonel Polanco (born 8 June 1996), sometimes referred to as Chaparrito, is a Belizean international footballer who plays as a midfielder for Premier League of Belize side Belmopan Bandits.

International career
Polanco made his international debut in a 1–1 away draw with the Cayman Islands. He replaced Elroy Kuylen in the 94th minute.

Career statistics

International

References

External links
 

1996 births
Living people
Belizean footballers
Belize international footballers
Association football midfielders
Belmopan Bandits players